In meteorology and climatology, a mesonet, portmanteau of mesoscale network, is a network of automated weather and, often also including environmental monitoring stations, designed to observe mesoscale meteorological phenomena and/or microclimates. 

Dry lines, squall lines, and sea breezes are examples of phenomena observed by mesonets. Due to the space and time scales associated with mesoscale phenomena and microclimates, weather stations comprising a mesonet are spaced closer together and report more frequently than synoptic scale observing networks, such as the WMO Global Observing System (GOS) and US ASOS. The term mesonet refers to the collective group of these weather stations, which are usually owned and operated by a common entity. Mesonets generally record in situ surface weather observations but some involve other observation platforms, particularly vertical profiles of the planetary boundary layer (PBL). Other environmental parameters may include insolation and various variables of interest to particular users, such as soil temperature or road conditions (the latter notable in Road Weather Information System (RWIS) networks).

The distinguishing features that classify a network of weather stations as a mesonet are station density and temporal resolution with sufficiently robust station quality. Micronets (see microscale and storm scale), such as in metropolitan areas such as Oklahoma City, St. Louis, and Birmingham UK, are yet denser in spatial and sometimes temporal resolution.

Purpose 
Thunderstorms and other atmospheric convection, squall lines, drylines, sea and land breezes, mountain breeze and valley breezes, mountain waves, mesolows and mesohighs, wake lows, mesoscale convective vortices (MCVs), tropical cyclone and extratropical cyclone rainbands, macrobursts, gust fronts and outflow boundaries, heat bursts, urban heat islands (UHIs), and other mesoscale phenomena, as well as topographical features, can cause weather and climate conditions in a localized area to be significantly different from that dictated by the ambient large-scale conditions. As such, meteorologists must understand these phenomena in order to improve forecast skill. Observations are critical to understanding the processes by which these phenomena form, evolve, and dissipate. 

The long-term observing networks (ASOS, AWOS, COOP), however, are too sparse and report too infrequently for mesoscale research and forecasting. The Cooperative Observer Program (COOP) database consists of only daily reports recorded manually. That network, like the more recent CoCoRaHS, is large but both are limited in reporting frequency and robustness of equipment. "Mesoscale" weather phenomena occur on spatial scales of a few to hundreds of kilometers and temporal (time) scales of minutes to hours. Thus, an observing network with finer temporal and spatial scales is needed for mesoscale research. This need led to the development of the mesonet. 

Mesonet data is directly used by humans for decision making, but also boosts the skill of numerical weather prediction (NWP) and is especially beneficial for short-range mesoscale models. Mesonets, along with remote sensing solutions (data assimilation of weather radar, weather satellites, wind profilers), allow for much greater temporal and spatial resolution in a forecast model. As the atmosphere is a chaotic nonlinear dynamical system (i.e. subject to the Butterfly effect), this increase in data increases understanding of initial conditions and boosts model performance. In addition to meteorology and climatology users, hydrologists, foresters, wildland firefighters, transportation departments, energy producers and distributors, other utility interests, and agricultural entities are prominent in their need for fine scale weather information. These organizations operate dozens of mesonets within the US and globally. Environmental, outdoor recreational, emergency management and public safety, military, and insurance interests also are heavy users of mesonet information. 

In many cases, mesonet stations may, by necessity or sometimes by lack of awareness, be located in positions where accurate measurements may be compromised. For instance, this is especially true of citizen science and crowdsourced data systems, such as the stations built for WeatherBug's network, many of which are located on school buildings. The Citizen Weather Observer Program (CWOP) facilitated by the US National Weather Service (NWS) and other networks such as those collected by Weather Underground help fill gaps with resolutions sometimes meeting or exceeding that of mesonets, but many stations also exhibit biases due to improper siting, calibration, and maintenance. These consumer grade "personal weather stations" (PWS) are also less sensitive and rigorous than scientific grade stations. The potential bias that these stations may cause must be accounted for when ingesting the data into a model, lest the phenomenon of "garbage in, garbage out" occur.

Operations 

Mesonets were born out of the need to conduct mesoscale research. The nature of this research is such that mesonets, like the phenomena they were meant to observe, were (and sometimes still are) short-lived and may change rapidly. Long-term research projects and non-research groups, however, have been able to maintain a mesonet for many years. For example, the U.S. Army Dugway Proving Ground in Utah has maintained a mesonet for many decades. The research-based origin of mesonets led to the characteristic that mesonet stations may be modular and portable, able to be moved from one field program to another. Nonetheless, most large contemporary mesonets or nodes within consist of permanent stations comprising stationary networks. Some research projects, however, utilize mobile mesonets. Prominent examples include the VORTEX projects. The problems of implementing and maintaining robust fixed stations are exacerbated by lighter, compact mobile stations and are further worsened by various issues related when moving, such as vehicle slipstream effects, and particularly during rapid changes in the ambient environment associated with traversing severe weather.

Whether the mesonet is temporary or semi-permanent, each weather station is typically independent, drawing power from a battery and solar panels. An on-board computer records readings from several instruments measuring temperature, humidity, wind speed and direction, and atmospheric pressure, as well as soil temperature and moisture, and other environmental variables deemed important to the mission of the mesonet, solar irradiance being a common non-meteorological parameter. The computer periodically saves these data to memory, typically using data loggers, and transmits the observations to a base station via radio, telephone (wireless, such as cellular or landline), or satellite transmission. Advancements in computer technology and wireless communications in recent decades made possible the collection of mesonet data in real-time. Some stations or networks report using Wi-Fi and grid powered with backups for redundancy. 

The availability of mesonet data in real-time can be extremely valuable to operational forecasters, and particularly for nowcasting, as they can monitor weather conditions from many points in their forecast area. In addition to operational work, and weather, climate, and environmental research, mesonet and micronet data are often important in forensic meteorology.

History 

Early mesonets operated differently from modern mesonets. Each constituent instrument of the weather station was purely mechanical and fairly independent of the other sensors. Data were recorded continuously by an inked stylus that pivoted about a point onto a rotating drum covered by a sheath of graphed paper called a trace chart, much like a traditional seismograph station. Data analysis could occur only after the trace charts from the various instruments were collected.

One of the earliest mesonets operated in the summer of 1946 and 1947 and was part of a field campaign called The Thunderstorm Project. As the name implies, the objective of this program was to better understand thunderstorm convection. The earliest mesonets were typically funded and operated by government agencies for specific campaigns. In time, universities and other quasi-public entities began implementing permanent mesonets for a wide variety of uses, such as agricultural or maritime interests. Consumer grade stations added to the professional grade synoptic and mesoscale networks by the 1990s and by the 2010s professional grade station networks operated by private companies and public-private consortia increased in prominence. Some of these privately implemented systems are permanent and at fixed locations, but many also service specific users and campaigns/events so may be installed for limited periods, and may also be mobile.

The first known mesonet was operated by Germany from 1939 to 1941. Early mesonets with project based purposes operated for limited periods of time from seasons to a few years. The first permanently operating mesonet began in the United States in the 1970s with more entering operation in the 1980s-1990s as numbers gradually increased preceding a steeper expansion by the 2000s. By the 2010s there was also an increase in mesonets on other continents. Some wealthy densely populated countries also deploy observation networks with the density of a mesonet, such as the AMeDAS in Japan. The US was an early adopter of mesonets, yet funding has long been scattered and meager. By the 2020s declining funding atop the earlier scarcity and uncertainty of funding was leading to understaffing and problems maintaining stations, the closure of some stations, and the viability of entire networks threatened. 

Mesonets capable of being moved for fixed station deployments in field campaigns came into use in the US by the 1970s and fully mobile vehicle-mounted mesonets became fixtures of large field research projects following the field campaigns of Project VORTEX in 1994 and 1995, in which significant mobile mesonets were deployed.

Significant mesonets 
The following table is an incomplete list of mesonets operating in the past and present:

* Not all stations owned or operated by network.
** As these are private stations, although QA/QC measures may be taken, these may not be scientific grade, and may lack proper siting, calibration, sensitivity, durability, and maintenance.

Although not labeled a mesonet, the Japan Meteorological Agency (JMA) also maintains a nationwide surface observation network with the density of a mesonet. The network began operating in 1974.

See also
 MesoWest
 Remote Automated Weather Station (RAWS)
 TAMDAR
 Surface weather analysis
 Automated airport weather station

References

External links

 National Mesonet Program
 MADIS Meteorological Surface Integrated Mesonet Data Providers (MADIS) 
 National Mesonet/UrbaNet Data Overview (NCEP Central Operations)
 Hydrometeorological Networks in the United States
 MesoWest 
 Synoptic Data PBC's Station Networks & Providers 
 Personal Weather Station Network (Weather Underground) 
 Citizen Weather Observer Program (CWOP) (wxqa.com)
 FindU.com (APRS) 
 Midwest Mesonets and Specialized Instrumented Sites (Midwestern Regional Climate Center) 
 FAESR: Surface In-Situ Networks (NCAR's Facilities for Atmospheric and Earth Science Research) 
 Surface Remote and Emerging Technologies

Mesoscale meteorology
Meteorological data and networks